Below is the order of battle for the Western Henan - Northern Hubei Border Campaign, fought late March through late May 1945. It was one of the 22 major engagements between the National Revolutionary Army and the Imperial Japanese Army during the Second Sino-Japanese War.

Japan 
As of mid-March 1945

Northern Hubei Command 
Sinnosuke Sasaki
 39th Division ‒ Sumida
 39th Infantry Brigade Group
 231st Infantry Regiment
 232nd Infantry Regiment
 233rd Infantry Regiment
 39th Recon regiment
 39th Field Artillery Regiment
 39th Engineer Regiment
 39th Transport Regiment
 5th Independent Mixed Brigade (elements) ‒ ?
 16th Independent Infantry Battalion
 17th Independent Infantry Battalion
 18th Independent Infantry Battalion
 19th Independent Infantry Battalion
 20th Independent Infantry Battalion
 artillery troops
 labor troops.
 11th Independent Mixed Brigade (elements)
 Field Replacement Detachment (elements)
 13 Armoured Cars

Western Henan Command (12th Army) 
Lieutenant General Takashi Takamori
 3rd Division  (elements) 
 3rd Infantry Brigade Group
 6th Infantry Regiment
 68th Infantry Regiment
 34th Infantry Regiment
 3rd Field Artillery Regiment
 3rd Cavalry Regiment
 3rd Engineer Regiment
 3rd Transport Regiment
 69th Division (elements)
 59th Infantry brigade
 82nd, 83rd, 84th, 85th Independent Infantry Battalions
 60th Infantry brigade
 86th, 118th, 119th, 120th Independent Infantry Battalions
 Signal communication unit
 labor troops
 transport  team
 110th Division 
 110th Infantry Regiment
 139th Infantry Regiment
 163rd Infantry Regiment
 6th Field Artillery Regiment
 Mountain Artillery squadron
 40th Independent Engineer regiment
 25th Transport Regiment
 115th Division 
 85th Infantry Brigade
 26th, 27, 28, 29 Independent Infantry Battalions
 86th Infantry brigade
 30th, 385, 386, 387 Independent Infantry Battalions
 117th Division (elements) 
 87th Infantry brigade ‒ (headquarters Kaifeng)
 203rd, 204th, 205th, 206th  Independent Infantry Battalions
 88th Infantry brigade (headquarters Zhengzhou)
 388th, 389th, 390th, 391st Independent Infantry Battalions
 11th Independent Mixed Brigade ‒ Takeo Miyashita
 46th, 47th, 48th, 49th, 50th Independent Infantry Battalions
 artillery troops
 labor troops
 signal communication unit.
 14th Independent Mixed Brigade ‒ Yashikata Yoshikawa
 61st, 62nd, 63rd, 64th, 65th Independent Infantry Battalions
 artillery troops
 labor troops
 signal communication unit.
 4th Cavalry Brigade  –
 4th Cavalry Regiment
 25th Cavalry Regiment (in Huaiyang)
 26th Cavalry Regiment (in 商邱)
 3rd Tank Division (>100 tanks) (elements)
 13th Tank Regiment
 17th Tank Regiment
 3rd Mobile Infantry regiment (in Lushan, Baofeng)
 3rd mobile artillery regiment (in Xiangcheng, Lushan, Ye County)
 Quick-firing artillery team (in Shan county)
 reconnaissance troops (in Ye County)
 labor troops (in Wang village)
 AA team (in Ying bridge).
 Military transport units (1,000+ transport vehicles)

China 
As of mid-March 1945

First War Area 
Hu Zongnan (acting)
 31st Army Group ‒ Wang Zhonglian
 27th Corps ‒ Hsieh Fusan
 47th Division
 4th Provincial Division
 28th Division
 64th Provincial Division (uncommitted)
 78th Corps ‒ Lai Ju-hsiung
 New 42nd Division
 New 43rd Division
 New 44th Division
 85th Corps ‒ Wu Shao-chao
 23rd Division
 110th Division
 55th Provincial Division
 89th Corps
 62nd Provincial Division
 New 1st Division
 4th Army Group ‒ Pei Chang-hui (acting)
 38th Corps ‒ Chang Yao-ming
 17th Division
 New 35th Division ?
 96th Corps ‒ Li Hsing-chung
 (main force) New 35th Division ?
 (main force) 117th Division
 90th Corps ‒ Yen Ming
 61st Division
 7th  Division (from 3rd Corps)
 40th Corps ‒ Ma Fa-wu
 39th Division
 106th Division
 New 40th Division
 Western Henan Garrison ‒ Liu Ju-ming
 15th Corps ‒ Wu Ting-lin
 64th Division
 65th Division
 55th Provincial Division (97th Corps)

Hebei-Chahar War Area 
Kao Shu-hsun
 New 8th Corps ‒ Hu Po-han
  New 6th Division
  29th Provincial Division

Fifth War Area 
Liu Zhi
 North Hubei Right Force (33rd Army Group) ‒  Feng Zhi'an
 59th Corps ‒ Liu Chen-san
 38th Division
 180th Division
  53rd Division
 77th Corps ‒ Ho Chi-feng
 132nd Division
 179th Division
 69th Corps ‒ Mi Wen-ho
 181st Division
 28th Provincial Division
 Western Henan Left Force (2nd Army Group) ‒ Liu Ruming
 55th Corps ‒ Tsao Fu-lin
 29th Division
 74th Division
  81st Division
 68th Corps ‒ Liu Ju-chen
 119th Division
 143rd Division
 36th Provincial Division
 Western Henan Center Force (22nd Army Group) ‒ Sun Zhen
 41st Corps ‒ Tseng Su-sheng
 122nd Division
 124th Division
 45th Corps ‒ Chen Ting-hsun
 125th Division
 127th Division
 47th Corps ‒ Li Tsung-fang
 104th Division
 178th Division
 1st Provisional Corps
 16th Artillery Regiment
 4th Engineer Regiment

Tenth War Area 
Li Pin-hsien
 Army in Response ‒ Fu Li-ping
 9th Provisional Corps
 3rd Division
 4th Replacement Division
 13th Division
 20th Division
 27th Provincial Division
 173rd Division

Note:  A total of 148,000 men and 4 Airforce groups.

References

Sources 
 Hsu Long-hsuen and Chang Ming-kai, History of The Sino-Japanese War (1937–1945) 2nd Ed., 1971. Translated by Wen Ha-hsiung, Chung Wu Publishing; 33, 140th Lane, Tung-hwa Street, Taipei, Taiwan Republic of China. Pg. 452-57. Map 43.
  抗日战争时期的侵华日军序列沿革 (Order of battle of the Japanese army that invaded China during the Sino Japanese War)

Second Sino-Japanese War orders of battle